James Albert Michener ( or ; February 3, 1907 – October 16, 1997) was an American writer. He wrote more than 40 books, most of which were long, fictional family sagas covering the lives of many generations in particular geographic locales and incorporating detailed history. Many of his works were bestsellers and were chosen by the Book of the Month Club; he was known for the meticulous research that went into his books.

Michener's books include Tales of the South Pacific, for which he won the Pulitzer Prize for Fiction in 1948; Hawaii; The Drifters; Centennial; The Source; The Fires of Spring; Chesapeake; Caribbean; Caravans; Alaska; Texas; Space; Poland; and The Bridges at Toko-ri. His non-fiction works include Iberia, about his travels in Spain and Portugal; his memoir, The World Is My Home; and Sports in America. Return to Paradise combines fictional short stories with Michener's factual descriptions of the Pacific areas where they take place.

His first book was adapted as the popular Broadway musical South Pacific, by Rodgers and Hammerstein, and later as eponymous feature films in 1958 and 2001, adding to his financial success. A number of his other stories and novels were adapted for films and TV series.

He also wrote Presidential Lottery: The Reckless Gamble in Our Electoral System, in which he condemned the United States' Electoral College system. It was published in 1969, and republished in 2014 and 2016.

Biography
Michener was born in Doylestown, Pennsylvania. He later wrote that he did not know who his biological parents were, or exactly when or where he was born. He was raised a Quaker by an adoptive mother, Mabel Michener, in Doylestown, Bucks County, Pennsylvania.

Michener graduated from Doylestown High School in 1925. He attended Swarthmore College, in Swarthmore, Pennsylvania, where he played basketball and was a member of the Phi Delta Theta fraternity. After graduating summa cum laude in 1929, with a Bachelor of Arts degree in English and History, he traveled and studied in Scotland at the University of St Andrews in the medieval town of St. Andrews, Fife, on the coast of the North Sea for two years.

Michener talks about hoboing (riding freight trains for free) during the Great Depression, as mentioned in the 1998 Great Depression documentary on the History Channel.

Michener took a job as a high school English teacher at The Hill School in Pottstown, Pennsylvania. From 1933 to 1936, he taught English at George School in Newtown, Pennsylvania. He attended Colorado State Teachers College in Greeley, Colorado, (in 1970 renamed the University of Northern Colorado), where he earned a Master of Arts degree in education. After graduation, he taught at the university and at College High School (the University Lab School) for several years.  The library at the University of Northern Colorado was named after him in October 1972.

In 1935, Michener married Patti Koon. He accepted a Guest Lecturer position at Harvard, from 1939 to 1940, but left to join Macmillan Publishers as their social studies education editor.

Although as a Quaker, he could have qualified as a conscientious objector and not been drafted into the military, Michener enlisted in the United States Navy during World War II (1941–1945). He traveled throughout the South Pacific Ocean on various assignments which he gained because his base commanders mistakenly thought his father was Admiral Marc Mitscher.  His experiences during these travels inspired the stories published in his breakout work Tales of the South Pacific.

In 1960, Michener was chairman of the Bucks County committee to elect Democrat John F. Kennedy as the 35th President. In 1962, he unsuccessfully ran as a Democratic Party candidate for a seat in the U.S. House of Representatives from Pennsylvania, a decision he later considered a misstep. "My mistake was to run in 1962 as a Democratic candidate for Congress. [My wife] kept saying, 'Don't do it, don't do it.' I lost and went back to writing books."

In 1968, Michener served as the campaign manager for the U.S. Senator Joseph S. Clark of Pennsylvania, who was running for reelection to a third term. Clark ultimately lost the race to Richard Schweiker, a moderate Republican. Michener later served as Secretary for the 1967–1968 Pennsylvania Constitutional Convention. Also that year, Michener was a member of the Electoral College, serving as a Pennsylvania Democrat. He wrote about that experience in a political science text Presidential Lottery: The Reckless Gamble in Our Electoral System, which was published the following year. In it, he suggested alternate systems, including using a direct popular vote by majority for the office of President of the United States and other more creative solutions.

Writing career

Michener began his writing career during World War II, when as a lieutenant in the U.S. Navy he was assigned to the South Pacific as a naval historian. He later turned his notes and impressions into Tales of the South Pacific (1947), his first book, published when he was age 40. It won the Pulitzer Prize for fiction in 1948, and Rodgers and Hammerstein adapted it as the hit Broadway musical South Pacific, which premiered on Broadway in New York City in 1949.  The musical was also adapted as eponymous feature films in 1958 and 2001.

In the late 1950s, Michener began working as a roving editor for the Readers' Guide to Periodical Literature. He gave up that work in 1970.

Michener tried television writing but was unsuccessful. American television producer Bob Mann wanted Michener to co-create a weekly anthology series from Tales of the South Pacific and serve as narrator. Rodgers and Hammerstein, however, had bought all dramatic rights to the novel and did not relinquish their ownership.  Michener did lend his name to a different television series, Adventures in Paradise, in 1959, starring Gardner McKay as Captain Adam Troy in the sailing ship Tiki III.

Michener was a popular writer during his lifetime; his novels sold an estimated 75 million copies worldwide. His novel Hawaii (1959), well-timed on its publication when Hawaii became the 50th state, was based on extensive research. He used this approach for nearly all of his subsequent novels, which were based on detailed historical, cultural, and even geological research. Centennial (1974), which documented several generations of families in the Rocky Mountains of the American West, was adapted as a popular 12-part television miniseries of the same name and aired on the National Broadcasting Company (NBC television network) from October 1978 through February 1979.

In 1996, State House Press published James A. Michener: A Bibliography, compiled by David A. Groseclose. Its more than 2,500 entries from 1923 to 1995 include magazine articles, forewords, and other works.

Michener's prodigious output made for lengthy novels, several of which run more than 1,000 pages. The author states in My Lost Mexico (1992) that at times he would spend 12 to 15 hours per day at his typewriter for weeks on end, and that he used so much paper, his filing system had trouble keeping up.

Marriages
Michener was married three times. In 1935, he married Patti Koon. In 1948, they divorced, and the same year Michener married his second wife, Vange Nord.

Michener met his third wife, Mari Yoriko Sabusawa, at a luncheon in Chicago. An American, she and her Japanese parents were interned in western camps that the U.S. government set up during the early years of  World War II to hold ethnic Japanese from West Coast / Pacific communities. Michener divorced Nord in 1955 and married Sabusawa the same year. Sabusawa died in 1994.

Michener's novel Sayonara (1954) is quasi-autobiographical. Set during the early 1950s, it tells the story of Major Lloyd Gruver, a United States Air Force ace jet pilot in the Korean War (1950–1953), now stationed in Japan, who falls in love with Hana-Ogi, a Japanese woman. The novel follows their cross-cultural romance and illuminates the racism of the post-World War II time period. In 1957 it was adapted into the highly successful movie Sayonara which starred Marlon Brando, James Garner, Miiko Taka, Miyoshi Umeki and Red Buttons; Umeki and Buttons both won the 1958 Academy Award ("Oscar") for best supporting actor / actress for their performances.

Philanthropist
Michener became a major philanthropist, donating more than $100 million to educational, cultural, and writing institutions, including his alma mater, Swarthmore College, the Iowa Writers Workshop, and the James A. Michener Art Museum, and more than $37 million to University of Texas at Austin. By 1992, his gifts made him UT Austin's largest single donor to that time. Over the years, Mari Michener played a major role in helping direct his donations.

In 1989, Michener donated the royalty earnings from the Canadian edition of his novel Journey (1989), published in Canada by McClelland & Stewart, to create the Journey Prize, an annual Canadian literary prize worth $10,000 (CDN) that is awarded for the year's best short story published by an emerging Canadian writer.

Final years and death

In the Micheners' final years, he and his wife lived in Austin, Texas, and they endowed the Michener Center for Writers at the University of Texas at Austin. The Center provides three-year Michener Fellowships in fiction, poetry, playwriting and screenwriting to a small number of students.

Suffering from terminal kidney disease, in October 1997, Michener ended the daily dialysis treatment that had kept him alive for four years. He said he had accomplished what he wanted and did not want further physical complications. On October 16, 1997, he died of kidney failure, at age 90. Michener was cremated, and his ashes were placed next to those of his wife at Austin Memorial Park Cemetery in Austin, Texas. Michener is honored by a memorial headstone at the Texas State Cemetery in Austin.

Bequests
Michener left most of his estate and book copyrights to Swarthmore College, where he earned his bachelor's degree. He had donated his papers to the University of Northern Colorado, where he earned his master's degree.

Honors

 In 1971, Michener was awarded the Golden Plate Award of the American Academy of Achievement
 In 1980, Michener threw out the first pitch of Game Two of the National League Championship between the Philadelphia Phillies and the Houston Astros. 
 In 1981, Michener was awarded the St. Louis Literary Award from the Saint Louis University Library Associates in St. Louis, Missouri.
 In 1993, the U.S. Navy Memorial Foundation awarded Michener its "Lone Sailor Award" for his naval war service and his literary achievements.
 In 1994, Michener endorsed the naming as "Michener's" the restaurant at Iririki Island Resort, Port Vila, Vanuatu. He wrote:

Many of the fondest memories of my travels stem back to my years of military service in the New Hebrides – (now Vanuatu) – during the Pacific War years of the early 1940s...While those beautiful islands have changed much with progress in the ensuing years, I know from subsequent visits that the friendliness of the peoples, their infectious smiles and their open-heartedness will remain forever one of life's treasures.

Posthumous
 On May 12, 2008, the United States Postal Service honored him with a 59¢ Distinguished Americans series postage stamp.
 The Library at The University of Northern Colorado in Greeley, Colorado, his alma mater, is named "The James Michener Library" in his honor. On the mezzanine, there is a small display of his effects, including one of his typewriters.
 In 1998, the Raffles Hotel in Singapore named one of their suites after the author, in memory of his patronage and affection for the hotel. Michener first stayed at the Singapore hotel in 1949 after World War II. In a 1987 interview, he said it was a luxury for him, a young man, to stay at the Raffles Hotel then, and that he had the time of his life. He returned on a later trip. The suite was officially christened by Steven J. Green, Ambassador of United States to Singapore.

James A. Michener Art Museum

Opened in 1988, in Michener's hometown of Doylestown, Pennsylvania, the James A. Michener Art Museum houses collections of local and well-known artists. Michener pledged $5.5 million to the museum in 1996.  Constructed from the remains of an old state prison, the museum is a non-profit organization with both permanent and rotating collections. Two prominent permanent fixtures are the James A. Michener display room and the Nakashima Reading Room, constructed in honor of his third wife's Japanese heritage. The museum is known for its permanent collection of Pennsylvania Impressionist paintings.

James A. Michener Society
The James A. Michener Society was formed in the fall of 1998. It comprises people who share a common interest and admirers of Michener's life and work. The society sponsors a variety of activities and publishes an electronic internet newsletter. Annual meetings of members are held at locations closely associated with Michener's life.
The society's purpose is to:
 Preserve the intellectual legacy of James A. Michener as a writer, teacher, historian, public servant, patriot, and philanthropist
 Ensure that future generations have full access to all his writings
 Promote the exchange of ideas and information about his writings
 Encourage fellowship among readers of his writings
 Inform devotees and members of the Society about recent publications and critiques of his writings

Works
In addition to writing novels, short stories, and non-fiction, Michener was very involved with movies, TV series, and radio. The following is only a selection of the listings in the Library of Congress files.

Books—fiction

Books—nonfiction

Adaptations

See also
 List of bestselling novels in the United States
 Edward Rutherfurd

References

Further reading
  (His formative school years with Michener's personal reminiscences.)
 
 
 
 
 
  (Memoir by a long-time friend of Michener's.)
  (Photo essay and commentary on Michener's writing of Iberia in Spain.)

External links

 
 Published books with covers
 James A. Michener Library at the University of Northern Colorado
 James A. Michener Biography and Interview on American Academy of Achievement
 James A. Michener Collection at the University of Northern Colorado
 James A. Michener Society
 James A. Michener Art Museum, Doylestown, PA
 Michener Center for Writers at the University of Texas at Austin
 Michener: His Influence and Ethics by Edward Rutherfurd
 Working with James A. Michener—The Making of The Covenant
 James Michener interviewed by Stephen Banker (~1978)
 Biographical Entry at the Texas State Cemetery
 

 
1907 births
1997 deaths
20th-century American educators
20th-century American essayists
20th-century American male writers
20th-century American memoirists
20th-century American naval officers
20th-century American non-fiction writers
20th-century American novelists
20th-century American poets
20th-century philanthropists
Alumni of the University of St Andrews
American adoptees
American historical novelists
American humanists
American male essayists
American male non-fiction writers
American male novelists
American male poets
American men's basketball players
American philanthropists
American political commentators
American political journalists
American political scientists
American social commentators
American social sciences writers
American social scientists
American sociologists
Burials at Texas State Cemetery
Critics of religions
Deaths from kidney failure
Environmental philosophers
Environmental writers
Novelists from Colorado
Novelists from Pennsylvania
Novelists from Texas
Pennsylvania Democrats
People from Doylestown, Pennsylvania
People from Greeley, Colorado
Philosophers of art
Philosophers of culture
Philosophers of history
Philosophers of literature
Philosophers of science
Philosophers of social science
Philosophers of technology
Philosophers of war
Poets from Colorado
Poets from Pennsylvania
Poets from Texas
Political philosophers
Presidential Medal of Freedom recipients
Pulitzer Prize for Fiction winners
Secular humanists
Social philosophers
Sonneteers
Space advocates
Sportswriters from Pennsylvania
Sportswriters from Texas
Swarthmore College alumni
Swarthmore Garnet Tide men's basketball players
Texas Longhorns women's basketball
The Hill School alumni
The Hill School faculty
Theorists on Western civilization
United States National Medal of Arts recipients
United States Navy officers
United States Navy personnel of World War II
University of Northern Colorado alumni
University of Northern Colorado faculty
Writers about activism and social change
Writers about communism
Writers about globalization
Writers about religion and science
Writers from Philadelphia
Writers of books about writing fiction
Writers of fiction set in prehistoric times
Writers of historical fiction set in antiquity
Writers of historical fiction set in the early modern period
Writers of historical fiction set in the Middle Ages
Writers of historical fiction set in the modern age
Writers of historical mysteries
Writers of historical romances
20th-century political scientists